Survival Instinct may refer to:
 Self-preservation, behavior that ensures the survival of an organism
 Survival Instinct (Star Trek: Voyager), the second episode of the sixth season of the science fiction television series Star Trek: Voyager
 The Walking Dead: Survival Instinct, a 2013 video game